Sandown Greyhounds or Sandown Park is a greyhound racing track located in Springvale, Victoria, Australia. Sandown Park is operated by the Sandown Greyhound Racing Club and hosts the Melbourne Cup and the Sandown Cup.

The track opened on 8 September 1956 and typically races every Thursday evening and Sunday afternoon. The track has race distances over 515, 595 and 715 metres.

Melbourne Cup
The Group 1 Melbourne Cup was the richest greyhound race in the Australia and was inaugurated in 1956. Trainers Darren McDonald, Graeme Bate and Jason Thompson have each won the Melbourne Cup on three occasions.

Sandown Cup
The $250,000 Group 1 Sandown Cup is Australia's richest staying race. The race was previously known as the Woolamai Cup when first ran back in 1963. Race record is held by the 595m record holder at Sandown Park, Bobby Boucheau.

Honour Roll (From 2000)

Shootout
Four of Australia's fastest greyhounds compete for the $50,000 winner-takes-all first prize. The four dog race was first run in 1998, with the race earning Group 3 status in 2008.

Honour Roll (From 1998)

References

1956 establishments in Australia
Greyhound racing venues in Australia
Sport in the City of Greater Dandenong
Buildings and structures in the City of Greater Dandenong
Sports venues completed in 1956